Michael Anthony Angus (born 28 October 1960) is an English former footballer who made 75 appearances in the Football League playing as a midfielder for Middlesbrough, Scunthorpe United and Darlington, whom he helped win promotion to the Third Division in 1984–85. He made a single appearance for Southend United in the League Cup, and also played non-league football for Guisborough Town and South Bank.

References

1960 births
Living people
Footballers from Middlesbrough
English footballers
Association football midfielders
Middlesbrough F.C. players
Scunthorpe United F.C. players
Southend United F.C. players
Darlington F.C. players
Guisborough Town F.C. players
South Bank F.C. players
English Football League players